Sturnira parvidens is a species of leaf-nosed bat found in Central America.

Taxonomy
It was described as a subspecies of the little yellow-shouldered bat (Sturnira lilium) in 1917 by American zoologist Edward Alphonso Goldman and given the trinomen S. lilium parvidens. The species name "parvidens" derives from Latin parvus, meaning "small", and dens, meaning "tooth". The little yellow-shouldered bat has been recognized as a species complex, and some authors have considered S. parvidens as a separate species since 2000. In 2013, a genetic study further supported that it should be recognized as a full species. It forms a clade with Sturnira bakeri.

Description
It has small teeth. The fur of its back is dark brown, with individual hairs possessing three or four color bands. Its belly fur is paler in color with tricolored hairs. Its face is brownish-gray.

Range and habitat
Sturnira parvidens occurs in many Central American countries, including: Belize, Costa Rica, El Salvador, Guatemala, Honduras, Mexico, and Nicaragua.

References

Mammals described in 1917
Bats of Central America
Sturnira
Taxa named by Edward Alphonso Goldman